Denis Viger (June 6, 1741 – June 16, 1805)  was a carpenter, businessman and political figure in Lower Canada.

He was born in Montreal in 1741, the son of a shoemaker. He worked as a carpenter and also carved wooden objects for the church at Saint-Denis. In 1772, he married Périne-Charles, the daughter of François-Pierre Cherrier, a notary. Viger then worked for the Hôtel-Dieu in Montreal. He also was involved in the sale and export of potash. In 1796, he was elected to the Legislative Assembly of Lower Canada in Montreal East as a supporter of the parti canadien.

He died at Montreal in 1805.

His son Denis-Benjamin later played an important role in the politics of the province. His nephew, Jacques Viger, was the first mayor of Montreal and his nephew Louis-Michel Viger became a lawyer and also served in the legislative assembly.

References

External links
 

Ancestors of Denis Viger (French)

1741 births
1805 deaths
Members of the Legislative Assembly of Lower Canada
Pre-Confederation Quebec people